Juan Carlos Mosquera Gómez (born 10 December 1982) is a Colombian footballer who plays for Cortuluá in the Categoría Primera A.

External links
 Atletico Nacional Official Website

1982 births
Living people
Colombian footballers
Footballers from Medellín
Atlético Nacional footballers
Deportes Quindío footballers
Once Caldas footballers
Deportivo Pasto footballers
Cortuluá footballers
Categoría Primera A players
Categoría Primera B players
Association football defenders